Yesterday, Today & Tomorrow is an album by American pianist Gene Harris recorded in 1973 and released on the Blue Note label.

Reception
The Allmusic review awarded the album 3 stars.

Track listing
 "On Green Dolphin Street" (Bronisław Kaper, Ned Washington) - 5:01  
 "Hymn To Freedom" (Oscar Peterson) - 5:37  
 "Trieste" (John Lewis) - 8:32  
 "Love For Sale" (Cole Porter) - 9:05  
 "Something" (George Harrison) - 8:46  
 "How Insensitive" (Antônio Carlos Jobim, Vinícius de Moraes, Norman Gimbel) - 16:30  
 "Judy, Judy, Judy" (Gene Harris) - 4:56  
 "After Hours" (Avery Parrish) - 5:27  
 "Sawin' Wood" (Harris) - 6:08  
 "Lil' Darling" (Neil Hefti) - 6:21  
 "Monk's Tune" (Monk Higgins) - 6:05 
Recorded at Motown Studio in Detroit, Michigan on June 14 & 15, 1973.

Personnel
Gene Harris - piano, arranger
Johnny Hatton - bass, electric bass
Carl Burnett - drums, percussion

References

Blue Note Records albums
Gene Harris albums
1973 albums
Albums produced by George Butler (record producer)